Velebites is a genus of middle Triassic ammonites from the Balkans belonging to the Aplococeratidae, a family within the Ceratitida. It is somewhat similar to Aplococeras in external form. The shell is evolute, discoidal with convex converging whorl sides and rounded venter.  Ribs are more recurved than in Aplococeras and the suture is ceratitic rather than goniatitic.

References

 Treatise on Invertebrate Paleontology Part L Mollusca 4

Aplococeratidae
Ceratitida genera
Triassic animals of Asia